The 2021 Ohio Valley Conference baseball tournament will be held from May 27 through 29 at The Ballpark at Jackson, a neutral venue in Jackson, Tennessee. The annual tournament determines the tournament champion of Division I Ohio Valley Conference in college baseball. The tournament champion will then earn the conference's automatic bid to the 2021 NCAA Division I baseball tournament.

Tournament

Bracket

References

Tournament
2021
2021 in sports in Tennessee
May 2021 sports events in the United States
2021
2021